Christopher Malcolm Taylor (born 15 January 1943) is an engineer who was the Vice-Chancellor of the University of Bradford, holding the post from 1 October 2001 until 30 April 2007 when he retired.

Life
Taylor was born in Leeds and educated at Leeds Modern School, King's College London (BScEng) and the University of Leeds (MSc, PhD, DEng).  He worked as an engineer for The English Electric Company Ltd and then was a Senior Engineering Consultant in an Industrial Unit of Tribology.
He started his academic career at the University of Leeds in 1971 and has published over 150 papers.

Honours
Taylor is a Fellow of the Institution of Mechanical Engineers (IMechE), a Chartered Engineer, a Fellow of the Royal Academy of Engineering and a Fellow of The City and Guilds of London Institute. In 2003 Taylor was President of the Institution of Mechanical Engineers.

Taylor's work has been recognised by the award of the Tribology Silver Medal of the IMechE.

References

External links
The Institution of Mechanical Engineers - Times of Change, Presidential Address, 28 May 2003

1943 births
Living people
Alumni of King's College London
Alumni of the University of Leeds
People associated with the University of Bradford
Fellows of the Royal Academy of Engineering
Fellows of the Institution of Mechanical Engineers
Vice-Chancellors of the University of Bradford